Desmodium tortuosum, the twisted tick trefoil, dixie tick trefoil, tall tick clover, Florida beggarweed, and giant beggar weed, is a species of flowering plant in the family Fabaceae. It is native to Latin America, and widely introduced as a forage to much of the rest of the world's subtropics and tropics.

References

tortuosum
Forages
Flora of Alabama
Flora of Mexico
Flora of Central America
Flora of the Caribbean
Flora of Venezuela
Flora of western South America
Flora of Brazil
Flora of Paraguay
Flora of Northwest Argentina
Flora of Northeast Argentina
Plants described in 1825